Galloping Thunder is a 1946 American Western film directed by Ray Nazarro and starring Charles Starrett. It was part of the series of Durango Kid films.

Cast
 Charles Starrett as Steve Reynolds / The Durango Kid 
 Adele Roberts as Jud Temple 
 Merle Travis as Guitar Player 
 The Bronco Busters as Themselves
 Smiley Burnette as Smiley Burnette 
 Richard Bailey as Grat Hanlon 
 Curt Barrett as Ranch Foreman 
 Ray Bennett as Henchman Wyatt 
 Budd Buster as Barber 
 Roy Butler as Rancher 
 Edmund Cobb as Henchman Barstow 
 Slim Duncan as Fife and Fiddle Player 
 Nolan Leary as Curt Lawson 
 Kermit Maynard as Henchman Krag 
 Merrill McCormick as Rancher 
 John Merton as Henchman Regan 
 Bob Reeves as Cowhand 
 Matty Roubert as Man with Match 
 Forrest Taylor as Colonel Collins

References

Bibliography
 Martin, Len D. Columbia Checklist: The Feature Films, Serials, Cartoons, and Short Subjects of Columbia Pictures Corporation, 1922-1988. McFarland, 1991.

External links
 

1946 films
1946 Western (genre) films
1940s English-language films
American Western (genre) films
Films directed by Ray Nazarro
Columbia Pictures films
American black-and-white films
1940s American films